Henry Hiles (31 December 1826 – 20 October 1904) was an English composer, organist, writer, and music educator.

Life
He was born in Shrewsbury, Hiles was the youngest of six sons. His eldest brother, John Hiles, was known as an arranger of organ music and for authoring several catechisms. He began studying the piano at the age of 4 and began studying the organ just a few years later.

He studied at the University of Oxford where he earned Bachelor of Music and Doctor of Music degrees. 
In 1892, he founded the Society of Professional Musicians. 
 
He held a number of church posts during his career, including serving as organist at the parish church at Bury, Lancashire (1845-47); Bishop Wearmouth;  St Michael Wood Street, London (1859);  St Thomas', Old Trafford, Manchester (1859-61); Bowdon parish church, Cheshire (1861-63); and St Paul's, Hulme, Manchester (1863-67).

He was a frequent contributor of articles to The Quarterly Musical Review for which he was also editor and propieter from 1885-1888. He taught for many years on the music faculty of the Royal Manchester College of Music where among his notable pupils was composer Leo Smith.

His compositions include oratorios and cantatas including David (1860), The Patriarchs (1866), Watchfulness, Fayre Pastoral and The Crusaders.

On 20 October 1904 at age 77, he died at Worthing, England.

Family

He married: first to Fanny Lockyer, and second to Isabel Higham. They had sons and one daughter.

References

Sources

1826 births
1904 deaths
Alumni of Magdalen Hall, Oxford
English composers
English organists
British male organists
19th-century English musicians
19th-century British male musicians
Oratorio composers
19th-century organists